Alton may refer to:

People
Alton (given name)
Alton (surname)

Places

Australia
Alton National Park, Queensland
Alton, Queensland, a town in the Shire of Balonne

Canada
Alton, Ontario
Alton, Nova Scotia

New Zealand
Alton, New Zealand, in Taranaki

United Kingdom
Alton, Derbyshire, England
Alton, Hampshire, England
Alton Abbey
Alton College
Alton, Leicestershire, England
Alton, Staffordshire, England
Alton Castle, presently a Catholic youth retreat centre
Alton Towers, theme park, formerly a country estate Alton Mansion
Alton, Wiltshire, England
Alton Estate, Roehampton, Greater London, England
Alton Water, a manmade reservoir in Suffolk

United States
Alton, Alabama, an unincorporated community
Alton, California, an unincorporated community
Alton, Florida, an unincorporated community
Alton, Illinois, a city
Alton, Indiana, a town
Alton, Iowa, a city
Alton, Kansas, a city
Alton, Kentucky, an unincorporated community
Alton, Maine, a town
Alton Township, Waseca County, Minnesota
Alton, Missouri, a city
Alton, New Hampshire, a New England town
Alton (CDP), New Hampshire, the main village in the town
Alton, New York, a hamlet
Alton, Rhode Island, a village
Alton, Texas, a city
Alton, Utah, a town
Alton, Virginia, an unincorporated community
Alton, West Virginia, an unincorporated community

History
First Battle of Alton, 1001
Treaty of Alton, signed in 1101 by Henry I of England and his older brother Robert, Duke of Normandy
Battle of Alton, fought in 1643 during the English Civil War

Transportation
Alton Railroad, a railroad linking Chicago, St. Louis, and Kansas City, Missouri
Alton line, a railway line in southeast England
Alton station (Illinois), an Amtrak station in Alton, Illinois
Alton railway station, in Alton, Hampshire, England
Alton Junction, a railroad junction in Chicago, Illinois
Alton Junction, Utah, a highway junction in Utah

Other uses
Alton Steel, a steel manufacturer based in Alton, Illinois
The Alton family, in Marion Zimmer Bradley's Darkover novels

See also
North Alton, Nova Scotia
South Alton, Nova Scotia
D'Alton
Altun Ha, ruins of an ancient Mayan city in Belize
Elton (disambiguation)